The TSIR-5190 is a five cylinder two-stroke radial piston aircraft engine developed for aircraft applications by McCulloch Motors Corporation.

Joe Crover and his father patented new technologies to complete development of the engine for production use. A pair of TRAD-4180s four cylinder diesels and a single TSIR-5190 from the Western Museum of Flight are in use for development.

Specifications (TSIR-5190)

References

External links
Crover Diesel
Video of dis-assembly
Video of restoration
Video of McCulloch TSIR-5190 Animation and Test Run

1960s aircraft piston engines
Aircraft air-cooled radial piston engines
Two-stroke aircraft piston engines
Radial engines